Picasso is an album by the David Murray Octet, released on the Japanese DIW label in 1993. It features performances by Murray, Rasul Siddik, Hugh Ragin, Craig Harris, James Spaulding, Dave Burrell, Wilber Morris and Tani Tabbal. "Picasso Suite" is a tribute to both Pablo Picasso and Coleman Hawkins's tribute to Picasso. It was written for the Northeast Ohio Jazz Society and the Cleveland Museum of Art.

Reception
The AllMusic review awarded the album 3 stars.

Track listing
 "Picasso Suite: Introduction" - 2:30 
 "Picasso Suite: Catalonian Vonz" - 9:27 
 "Picasso Suite: La Vie-The Jazz Life" - 4:38 
 "Picasso Suite: Portrait Of Sax And Yac" - 3:16 
 "Picasso Suite: Airtime For Hawkins" - 4:10 
 "Picasso Suite: When Hawk Meets Pablo" - 12:20 
 "Picasso Suite: Reprise; Catalonian Vonz" - 1:26 
 "Menehune Messages" (Burrell, Monika Larsson) - 7:43 
 "Chazz" (Morris) - 7:19 
 "Shakill's Warrior" - 9:26 
All compositions by David Murray except as indicated
Recorded September 1, 2, 9, & 11, 1992, NYC

Personnel
David Murray - tenor saxophone, bass clarinet
Rasul Siddik - trumpet
Hugh Ragin - trumpet
Craig Harris - trombone
James Spaulding - alto saxophone, flute
Dave Burrell - piano
Wilber Morris - bass
Tani Tabbal - drums

References 

1993 albums
David Murray (saxophonist) albums
DIW Records albums